The A88 motorway is a French toll motorway that connects Caen to the A28 for Le Mans for Central and Southern France. Its inauguration took place on 26 August 2010 by Dominique Bussereau, Secretary of State for Transport. It doubles the old RN 158.

A88 traffic information is provided by Normandie Traffic Radio, which is broadcast on 107.7 FM.

References

A88